Chestnut Street Bridge could refer to:
 Chestnut Street Bridge (Philadelphia)
 Chestnut Street Bridge (Detroit)